San Felipe Springs is a spring in Val Verde County, Texas. it lies at an elevation of 961 feet.

References

Bodies of water of Val Verde County, Texas
Springs of Texas
San Antonio–El Paso Road